Saikin Koi Shiteru? is an otome game developed by MiCROViSiON Inc. and published by D3 Publisher for Nintendo DS. It was released on July 30, 2009, with both standard and limited edition versions. Its CERO rating is B (12+), and its voice cast includes Motoko Kumai, Chiyako Shibahara, Megumi Toyoguchi, Kaori Nazuka, and Norio Wakamoto, among others.

Characters/Cast 

Sōhei Aiba (相羽壮平) - Miyu Irino
Takumi Shindō (新道拓海) - Yōji Ueda
Rei Kagami (加賀美怜) - Daisuke Namikawa
Ruka Kazama (風間瑠加) - Rakuto Tochihara

Yūsuke Saeki (佐伯雄介) - Kenjiro Tsuda
Miharu Sakurano (桜乃ミハル) - Ayahi Takagaki
Shin Akaigawa (赤井川慎) - Yuji Fujiwara
Wataru Mannami (万波亘) - Yūto Suzuki

Books 
  September 30, 2009

References

External links 
Official website
Saikin Koishiteru? at GameFAQs

2009 video games
Nintendo DS games
Nintendo DS-only games
Video games developed in Japan
Japan-exclusive video games
Otome games
Romance video games
D3 Publisher games
Visual novels
Single-player video games